Phaedrus may refer to:

People
 Phaedrus (Athenian) (c. 444 BC – 393 BC), an Athenian aristocrat depicted in Plato's dialogues
 Phaedrus (fabulist) (c. 15 BC – c. AD 50), a Roman fabulist
 Phaedrus the Epicurean (138 BC – c. 70 BC), an Epicurean philosopher

Art and literature
 Phaedrus (dialogue), a dialogue of Plato
 Phaedrus (play), a 3rd-century BCE comedic play by Alexis (poet)
 Phaedrus, a character in Zen and the Art of Motorcycle Maintenance
 A work by Cy Twombly
 Phaedrus, Johnathan, a character in the Reckoners novels by Brandon Sanderson.

See also
 Phaedra (disambiguation)